The 2014–15 Toronto Raptors season was the 20th season of the franchise in the National Basketball Association (NBA). In honor of the Raptors 20th season, they revealed the throwback purple "dino" jerseys to wear on several nights. The Raptors repeated as Atlantic Division champions for the first time in franchise history, and finished in fourth place in Eastern conference, winning 49 games during the regular season, breaking their franchise record of 48 wins in the previous season. Despite this achievement, the fourth-seeded Raptors were unexpectedly swept in the opening round of the playoffs by the fifth-seeded Washington Wizards as they extended their post-season series victory drought. Their all-time playoff series record dipped to one and seven, now having lost their last six consecutive series, and their lone series win coming in 2001 against the Knicks.  This year's defeat was primarily blamed on the team's poor defense which was notably exploited by the Wizards.

Draft picks

Regular season
The Raptors took advantage of a favourable early schedule to reach the top spot in the Eastern Conference for the first time in franchise history as well as having the best start in franchise history with a 9–2 record.  They briefly fell back to second after a loss to the Chicago Bulls, but regained the number one position one game later, which was followed by six-game winning streak. The Raptors remained as Eastern Conference leaders, but on November 28, 2014, the Raptors not only lost their position as NBA-leaders in a 106–102 loss to the Dallas Mavericks that dropped them to a 13–3 record but also faced a major setback when All-Star DeMar DeRozan tore his left adductor longus tendon in the third quarter of the game. This was followed by another loss to the Los Angeles Lakers in overtime two nights later when Kobe Bryant recorded his first triple double of the season defeating the Raptors 129–122. The Raptors also fell to the Cleveland Cavaliers in back-to-back games before entering a six-game winning streak without DeRozan. However, things began to fall apart after a six-game road trip during the winter holidays where they lost 4 of those 6 games as poor defense led to a 2–8 record in their first ten games in January. The downfall dropped the team from first place to the Atlanta Hawks and found themselves battling for second with the Washington Wizards as DeRozan returned to the lineup on January 14. On January 22, Kyle Lowry was named as a starter for the 2015 NBA All-Star Game after a last-minute voting rally by fans with help by Canadian Prime Minister Stephen Harper and celebrity Justin Bieber (who tweeted his support on Twitter but failed to include '#NBAballot' in his tweet) helped Lowry overtake Dwyane Wade who was second in the backcourt votes. This makes him the third Raptor to start in the all-star game after Chris Bosh and Vince Carter. The Raptors ended the month of January on a positive note with a six-game winning streak which included back-to-back overtime victories to the Brooklyn Nets and Washington Wizards however, struggled in February as the Raptors went 4–7. The rest of the season represented a decline for the Raptors as they won just 13 of 29 games after the all-star break and all-star point guard Lowry averaged 15.3 PPG while struggling with back spasms in the latter part of the season. Despite the lows, the Raptors finished once again as Atlantic Division Champions finishing with a franchise-high 49 wins while clinching the fourth seed.

Standings
The Raptors faced off against the Wizards in the opening round of the playoffs where they once again faced Paul Pierce who faced the Raptors in the previous year with the Brooklyn Nets where he blocked a potential game-winning shot by Lowry. Much of the anticipation for the playoffs were created by Pierce who stated that the Raptors 'did not have it' which disgruntled many Raptor fans.

Standings

Record vs opponents

(* game decided in overtime)

Game log

Preseason

|- style="background:#cfc;"
| 1
| October 5
| Sacramento
| 
| DeMar DeRozan (21)
| Amir Johnson (8)
| Greivis Vásquez (5)
| Rogers Arena 19,908
| 1–0
|- style="background:#fcc;"
| 2
| October 7
| @ Sacramento
| 
| Kyle Lowry (25)
| Hansbrough, Johnson & Valančiūnas (5)
| Kyle Lowry (6)
| Sleep Train Arena 12,546
| 1–1
|- style="background:#cfc;"
| 3
| October 10
| Boston
| 
| DeRozan & Lowry (18)
| Jonas Valančiūnas (9)
| Kyle Lowry (6)
| Air Canada Centre 18,201
| 2–1
|- style="background:#cfc;"
| 4
| October 13
| @ New York
| 
| Louis Williams (21)
| Tyler Hansbrough (6)
| Louis Williams (3)
| Madison Square Garden 19,867
| 3–1
|- style="background:#cfc;"
| 5
| October 15
| @ Boston
| 
| Jordan Hamilton (16)
| Johnson, Ross & Vásquez (5)
| Vásquez, Fields & Hamilton (3)
| TD Garden 14,309
| 4–1
|- style="background:#cfc;"
| 6
| October 17
| Oklahoma City
| 
| Terrence Ross (22)
| 7 Players Tied (4)
| DeRozan & Lowry (4)
| Intrust Bank Arena 9,534
| 5–1
|- style="background:#cfc;"
| 7
| October 24
| New York
| 
| DeMar DeRozan (15)
| Kyle Lowry & Patrick Patterson (7)
| Kyle Lowry (8)
| Bell Centre 20,738
| 6–1

Regular season

|- style="background:#cfc;"
| 1
| October 29
| Atlanta
| 
| Jonas Valančiūnas (17)
| DeMar DeRozan (11)
| Kyle Lowry (10)
| Air Canada Centre19,800
| 1–0

|- style="background:#cfc;"
| 2
| November 1
| @ Orlando
| 
| DeMar DeRozan (26)
| Jonas Valančiūnas (11)
| Kyle Lowry (5)
| Amway Center16,141
| 2–0
|- style="background:#fcc;"
| 3
| November 2
| @ Miami
| 
| DeMar DeRozan (30)
| Jonas Valančiūnas (8)
| Kyle Lowry (3)
| American Airlines Arena19,666
| 2–1
|-style="background:#cfc;"
| 4
| November 4
| Oklahoma City
| 
| DeMar DeRozan (16)
| Patrick Patterson (8)
| Kyle Lowry & James Johnson (5)
| Air Canada Centre18,877
| 3–1
|-style="background:#cfc;"
| 5
| November 5
| @ Boston
| 
| Kyle Lowry (35)
| Tyler Hansbrough (5)
| DeMar DeRozan (6)
| TD Garden16,249
| 4–1
|-style="background:#cfc;"
| 6
| November 7
| Washington
| 
| DeMar DeRozan (25)
| Kyle Lowry (11)
| Kyle Lowry (10)
| Air Canada Centre19,800
| 5–1
|-style="background:#cfc;"
| 7
| November 9
| Philadelphia
| 
| DeMar DeRozan (24)
| Tyler Hansbrough (6)
| Greivis Vásquez (6)
| Air Canada Centre18,470
| 6–1
|-style="background:#cfc;"
| 8
| November 11
| Orlando
| 
| Kyle Lowry (19)
| James Johnson (10)
| Kyle Lowry (7)
| Air Canada Centre19,800
| 7–1
|-style="background:#fcc;"
| 9
| November 13
| Chicago
| 
| Kyle Lowry (20)
| Lowry & Jonas Valančiūnas (8)
| Kyle Lowry (8)
| Air Canada Centre19,800
| 7–2
|-style="background:#cfc;"
| 10
| November 15
| Utah
| 
| DeMar DeRozan (27)
| Jonas Valančiūnas (14)
| Kyle Lowry (4)
| Air Canada Centre19,800
| 8–2
|-style="background:#cfc;"
| 11
| November 19
| Memphis
| 
| DeMar DeRozan (21)
| Amir Johnson (9)
| Kyle Lowry (7)
| Air Canada Centre19,800
| 9–2
|-style="background:#cfc;"
| 12
| November 21
| Milwaukee
| 
| Louis Williams (22)
| Jonas Valančiūnas (12)
| Greivis Vásquez (6)
| Air Canada Centre19,800
| 10–2
|-style="background:#cfc;"
| 13
| November 22
| @ Cleveland
| 
| Louis Williams (36)
| Patrick Patterson (6)
| Kyle Lowry (8)
| Quicken Loans Arena20,562
| 11–2
|-style="background:#cfc;"
| 14
| November 24
| Phoenix
| 
| Jonas Valančiūnas (27)
| Jonas Valančiūnas (11)
| Kyle Lowry (8)
| Air Canada Centre19,800
| 12–2
|-style="background:#cfc;"
| 15
| November 26
| @ Atlanta
| 
| DeMar DeRozan (27)
| Valančiūnas & Patterson (7)
| Kyle Lowry (13)
| Philips Arena16,253
| 13–2
|-style="background:#fcc;"
| 16
| November 28
| Dallas
| 
| Kyle Lowry (25)
| Jonas Valančiūnas (13)
| Greivis Vásquez (6)
| Air Canada Centre19,800
| 13–3
|-style="background:#fcc;"
| 17
| November 30
| @ LA Lakers
| 
| Kyle Lowry (29)
| Valančiūnas & Patterson (13)
| Kyle Lowry (9)
| Staples Center18,997
| 13–4

|-style="background:#cfc;"
| 18
| December 2
| @ Sacramento
| 
| Kyle Lowry (27)
| Jonas Valančiūnas (8)
| Kyle Lowry (13)
| Sleep Train Arena15,552
| 14–4
|-style="background:#cfc;"
| 19
| December 3
| @ Utah
| 
| Kyle Lowry (39)
| Jonas Valančiūnas (6)
| Greivis Vásquez (5)
| EnergySolutions Arena16,667
| 15–4
|-style="background:#fcc;"
| 20
| December 5
| Cleveland
| 
| Amir Johnson (27)
| Patrick Patterson (8)
| Kyle Lowry (9)
| Air Canada Centre20,077
| 15–5
|-style="background:#cfc;"
| 21
| December 8
| Denver
| 
| Louis Williams (26)
| Jonas Valančiūnas (12)
| Kyle Lowry (13)
| Air Canada Centre19,800
| 16–5
|-style="background:#fcc;"
| 22
| December 9
| @ Cleveland
| 
| Terrence Ross (18)
| Jonas Valančiūnas (15)
| Kyle Lowry (14)
| Quicken Loans Arena20,562
| 16–6
|-style="background:#cfc;"
| 23
| December 12
| Indiana
| 
| Louis Williams (26)
| Jonas Valančiūnas (14)
| Kyle Lowry (7)
| Air Canada Centre19,800
| 17–6
|-style="background:#cfc;"
| 24
| December 14
| @ New York
| 
| Terrence Ross (22)
| Jonas Valančiūnas (13)
| Kyle Lowry (11)
| Madison Square Garden19,812
| 18–6
|-style="background:#cfc;"
| 25
| December 15
| Orlando
| 
| Louis Williams (18)
| Jonas Valančiūnas (8)
| Kyle Lowry (8)
| Air Canada Centre19,800
| 19–6
|-style="background:#cfc;"
| 26
| December 17
| Brooklyn
| 
| Kyle Lowry (20)
| Jonas Valančiūnas (10)
| Kyle Lowry (12)
| Air Canada Centre19,800
| 20–6
|-style="background:#cfc;"
| 27
| December 19
| @ Detroit
| 
| Jonas Valančiūnas (17)
| A. Johnson & J. Johnson (8)
| Kyle Lowry (7)
| The Palace of Auburn Hills16,274
| 21–6
|-style="background:#cfc;"
| 28
| December 21
| New York
| 
| Lowry & Williams (22)
| Amir Johnson (9)
| Kyle Lowry (9)
| Air Canada Centre19,800
| 22–6
|-style="background:#fcc;"
| 29
| December 22
| @ Chicago
| 
| Kyle Lowry (34)
| Valančiūnas & Patterson (9)
| Vásquez & Williams (4)
| United Center21,846
| 22–7
|-style="background:#cfc;"
| 30
| December 27
| @ LA Clippers
| 
| Kyle Lowry (25)
| Amir Johnson (12)
| Kyle Lowry (7)
| Staples Center19,335
| 23–7
|-style="background:#cfc;"
| 31
| December 28
| @ Denver
| 
| Louis Williams (31)
| Terrence Ross (8)
| Kyle Lowry (11)
| Pepsi Center14,216
| 24–7
|-style="background:#fcc;"
| 32
| December 30
| @ Portland
| 
| Kyle Lowry (25)
| James Johnson (11)
| Kyle Lowry (5)
| Moda Center20,053
| 24–8

|-style="background:#fcc;"
| 33
| January 2
| @ Golden State
| 
| Greivis Vásquez (25)
| James Johnson (10)
| Kyle Lowry (8)
| Oracle Arena19,596
| 24–9
|-style="background:#fcc;"
| 34
| January 4
| @ Phoenix
| 
| Jonas Valančiūnas (21)
| Jonas Valančiūnas (10)
| Kyle Lowry (7)
| US Airways Center17,166
| 24–10
|-style="background:#fcc;"
| 35
| January 8
| Charlotte
| 
| Kyle Lowry (24)
| Kyle Lowry (7)
| Kyle Lowry (7)
| Air Canada Centre19,800
| 24–11
|-style="background:#cfc;"
| 36
| January 10
| Boston
| 
| Lowry, Williams (19)
| James Johnson (10)
| Kyle Lowry (7)
| Air Canada Centre19,800
| 25–11
|-style="background:#fcc;"
| 37
| January 12
| Detroit
| 
| Jonas Valančiūnas (31)
| Jonas Valančiūnas (12)
| Kyle Lowry (12) 
| Air Canada Centre19,800
| 25–12
|-style="background:#cfc;"
| 38
| January 14
| Philadelphia
| 
| DeMar DeRozan (20)
| Amir Johnson (16)
| Kyle Lowry (12)
| Air Canada Centre19,800
| 26–12
|-style="background:#fcc;"
| 39
| January 16
| Atlanta
| 
| DeMar DeRozan (20)
| Valančiūnas, Johnson (6)
| Greivis Vásquez (6)
| Air Canada Centre19,800
| 26–13
|-style="background:#fcc;"
| 40
| January 18
| New Orleans
| 
| DeMar DeRozan (22)
| James Johnson (10)
| Greivis Vásquez (10)
| Air Canada Centre19,800
| 26–14
|-style="background:#cfc;"
| 41
| January 19
| @ Milwaukee
| 
| Kyle Lowry (18)
| Valančiūnas & Patterson (13)
| DeMar DeRozan (4)
| BMO Harris Bradley Center12,707
| 27–14
|-style="background:#fcc;"
| 42
| January 21
| @ Memphis
| 
| Louis Williams (21)
| Jonas Valančiūnas (10)
| Lowry, Vásquez, Johnson (19)
| FedExForum15,112
| 27–15
|-style="background:#cfc;"
| 43
| January 23
| @ Philadelphia
| 
| Kyle Lowry (21)
| Patrick Patterson (13)
| Kyle Lowry (5)
| Wells Fargo Center13,640
| 28–15
|-style="background:#cfc;"
| 44
| January 25
| Detroit
| 
| DeMar DeRozan (25)
| Jonas Valančiūnas (11)
| Kyle Lowry (8)
| Air Canada Centre19,800
| 29–15
|-style="background:#cfc;"
| 45
| January 27
| @ Indiana
| 
| DeMar DeRozan (24)
| Jonas Valančiūnas (8)
| Kyle Lowry (8)
| Bankers Life Fieldhouse16,204
| 30–15
|-style="background:#cfc;"
| 46
| January 28
| Sacramento
| 
| Louis Williams (27)
| Jonas Valančiūnas (9)
| Kyle Lowry (7)
| Air Canada Centre19,800
| 31–15
|-style="background:#cfc;"
| 47
| January 30
| @ Brooklyn
| 
| DeMar DeRozan (26)
| Jonas Valančiūnas (11)
| DeMar DeRozan (9)
| Barclays Center17,062
| 32–15
|-style="background:#cfc;"
| 48
| January 31
| @ Washington
| 
| Kyle Lowry (23)
| DeMar DeRozan (8)
| DeMar DeRozan (10)
| Verizon Center20,356
| 33–15

|-style="background:#fcc;"
| 49
| February 2
| Milwaukee
| 
| DeMar DeRozan (16)
| Jonas Valančiūnas (13)
| Kyle Lowry (5)
| Air Canada Centre19,800
| 33–16
|-style="background:#fcc;"
| 50
| February 4
| Brooklyn
| 
| Terrence Ross (23)
| Jonas Valančiūnas (10)
| Kyle Lowry (10)
| Air Canada Centre19,800
| 33–17
|-style="background:#cfc;"
| 51
| February 6
| LA Clippers
| 
| DeMar DeRozan (24)
| DeMar DeRozan (9)
| DeMar DeRozan (8)
| Air Canada Centre19,800
| 34–17
|-style="background:#cfc;"
| 52
| February 8
| San Antonio
| 
| James Johnson (20)
| Jonas Valančiūnas (16)
| Kyle Lowry (7)
| Air Canada Centre19,800
| 35–17
|-style="background:#cfc;"
| 53
| February 11
| Washington
| 
| Louis Williams (27)
| Patrick Patterson (8)
| Kyle Lowry (6)
| Air Canada Centre19,800
| 36–17
|- align="center"
|colspan="9" bgcolor="#bbcaff"|All-Star Break
|-style="background:#cfc;"
| 54
| February 20
| @ Atlanta
| 
| Louis Williams (26)
| Jonas Valančiūnas (13)
| Kyle Lowry (9)
| Philips Arena18,968
| 37–17
|-style="background:#fcc;"
| 55
| February 21
| @ Houston
| 
| James Johnson (27)
| Valančiūnas, Johnson (7)
| Kyle Lowry (6)
| Toyota Center18,329
| 37–18
|-style="background:#fcc;"
| 56
| February 23
| @ New Orleans
| 
| Kyle Lowry (22)
| Jonas Valančiūnas (14)
| Kyle Lowry (5)
| Smoothie King Center 16,514
| 37–19
|-style="background:#fcc;"
| 57
| February 24
| @ Dallas
| 
| DeMar DeRozan (18)
| Jonas Valančiūnas (9)
| Kyle Lowry (6)
| American Airlines Center20,151
| 37–20
|-style="background:#fcc;"
| 58
| February 27
| Golden State
| 
| Terrence Ross (18)
| Jonas Valančiūnas (12)
| Greivis Vásquez (4)
| Air Canada Centre19,800
| 37–21
|-style="background:#fcc;"
| 59
| February 28
| @ New York
| 
| Louis Williams (22)
| Jonas Valančiūnas (8)
| Greivis Vásquez (6)
| Madison Square Garden19,812
| 37–22

|-style="background:#cfc;"
| 60
| March 2
| @ Philadelphia
| 
| DeMar DeRozan (35)
| DeMar DeRozan (9)
| Vásquez, DeRozan, Williams (5)
| Wells Fargo Center10,742
| 38–22
|-style="background:#fcc;"
| 61
| March 4
| Cleveland
| 
| Williams, Valančiūnas (26)
| Jonas Valančiūnas (11)
| Greivis Vásquez (13) 
| Air Canada Centre19,800
| 38–23
|-style="background:#fcc;"
| 62
| March 6
| @ Charlotte
| 
| DeMar DeRozan (30)
| Jonas Valančiūnas (6)
| Terrence Ross (7)
| Time Warner Cable Arena19,080
| 38–24
|-style="background:#fcc;"
| 63
| March 8
| @ Oklahoma City
| 
| DeMar DeRozan (24)
| Patrick Patterson (8)
| DeMar DeRozan (9)
| Chesapeake Energy Arena18,203
| 38–25
|-style="background:#fcc;"
| 64
| March 10
| @ San Antonio
| 
| Kyle Lowry (32)
| Amir Johnson (14)
| Kyle Lowry (5)
| AT&T Center18,581
| 38–26
|-style="background:#cfc;"
| 65
| March 13
| Miami
| 
| Kyle Lowry (19)
| Kyle Lowry (8)
| Kyle Lowry (8)
| Air Canada Centre19,800
| 39–26
|-style="background:#fcc;"
| 66
| March 15
| Portland
| 
| DeMar DeRozan (22)
| Jonas Valančiūnas (9)
| Kyle Lowry (6)
| Air Canada Centre19,800
| 39–27
|-style="background:#cfc;"
| 67
| March 16
| @ Indiana
| 
| Louis Williams (24)
| Jonas Valančiūnas (12)
| Kyle Lowry (10)
| Bankers Life Fieldhouse17,060
| 40–27
|-style="background:#cfc;"
| 68
| March 18
| Minnesota
| 
| DeMar DeRozan (21)
| Jonas Valančiūnas (15)
| Kyle Lowry (6) 
| Air Canada Centre19,800
| 41–27
|-style="background:#fcc;"
| 69
| March 20
| @ Chicago
| 
| DeMar DeRozan (27)
| DeMar DeRozan (6)
| Greivis Vásquez (6)
| United Center21,998
| 41–28
|-style="background:#cfc;"
| 70
| March 22
| New York
| 
| DeMar DeRozan (23)
| Jonas Valančiūnas (10)
| DeMar DeRozan (5)
| Air Canada Centre19,800
| 42–28
|-style="background:#fcc;"
| 71
| March 24
| @ Detroit
| 
| DeMar DeRozan (22)
| DeMar DeRozan (10)
| DeRozan, Patterson  (4)
| The Palace of Auburn Hills14,420
| 42–29
|-style="background:#fcc;"
| 72
| March 25
| Chicago
| 
| Greivis Vásquez (22)
| Jonas Valančiūnas (12)
| DeMar DeRozan (5)
| Air Canada Centre19,800
| 42–30
|-style="background:#cfc;"
| 73
| March 27
| LA Lakers
| 
| Jonas Valančiūnas (19)
| DeMar DeRozan (10)
| DeMar DeRozan (9)
| Air Canada Centre19,800
| 43–30
|-style="background:#cfc;"
| 74
| March 30
| Houston
| 
| DeMar DeRozan (42)
| Amir Johnson (16)
| Greivis Vásquez (7)
| Air Canada Centre19,800
| 44–30

|-style="background:#cfc;"
| 75
| April 1
| @ Minnesota
| 
| Louis Williams (18)
| Tyler Hansbrough (11)
| Patterson, Johnson (6)
| Target Center12,699
| 45–30
|-style="background:#fcc;"
| 76
| April 3
| @ Brooklyn
| 
| Louis Williams (23)
| Patterson, Valančiūnas (9)
| DeMar DeRozan (8)
| Barclays Center17,732
| 45–31
|-style="background:#fcc;"
| 77
| April 4
| Boston
| 
| Louis Williams (27)
| Jonas Valančiūnas (14)
| Louis Williams (4)
| Air Canada Centre19,800
| 45–32
|-style="background:#cfc;"
| 78
| April 8
| @ Charlotte
| 
| DeMar DeRozan (18)
| Tyler Hansbrough (12)
| DeMar DeRozan (7)
| Time Warner Cable Arena15,593
| 46–32
|-style="background:#cfc;"
| 79
| April 10
| @ Orlando
| 
| DeMar DeRozan (29)
| Jonas Valančiūnas (13)
| Kyle Lowry (7)
| Amway Center16,227
| 47–32
|-style="background:#cfc;"
| 80
| April 11
| @ Miami
| 
| DeMar DeRozan (24)
| Tyler Hansbrough (10)
| Patrick Patterson (3)
| American Airlines Arena19,689
| 48–32
|-style="background:#fcc;"
| 81
| April 14
| @ Boston
| 
| Lowry, Williams (14)
| Valančiūnas, Johnson (8)
| Greivis Vásquez (7)
| TD Garden18,624
| 48–33
|-style="background:#cfc;"
| 82
| April 15
| Charlotte
| 
| Kyle Lowry (26)
| Amir Johnson (6)
| Kyle Lowry (7)
| Air Canada Centre19,800
| 49–33

Playoffs

Game log

|- style="background:#fbb;"
| 1
| April 18
| Washington
| 
| Amir Johnson (18)
| DeMar DeRozan (11)
| DeMar DeRozan (6)
| Air Canada Centre19,800
| 0–1
|- style="background:#fbb;"
| 2
| April 21
| Washington
| 
| DeRozan, Williams (20)
| Jonas Valančiūnas (10)
| DeMar DeRozan (7)
| Air Canada Centre19,800
| 0–2
|- style="background:#fbb;"
| 3
| April 24
| @ Washington
| 
| DeMar DeRozan (32)
| Amir Johnson (12)
| Kyle Lowry (7)
| Verizon Center20,356
| 0–3
|- style="background:#fbb;"
| 4
| April 26
| @ Washington
| 
| Kyle Lowry (21)
| Jonas Valančiūnas (9)
| DeRozan, Lowry, Vásquez (4)
| Verizon Center20,356
| 0–4

Player statistics

Summer League

|-
|}

Preseason

|-
|}

Regular season

|-
|}

Injuries

Roster

Transactions

Trades

Free agents

Re-signed

Additions

Subtractions

Awards

References

External links

 2014–15 Toronto Raptors preseason at ESPN
 2014–15 Toronto Raptors regular season at ESPN

Toronto Raptors seasons
Toronto Raptors
Tor